= Jakey Boehm =

Australian TikTok personality

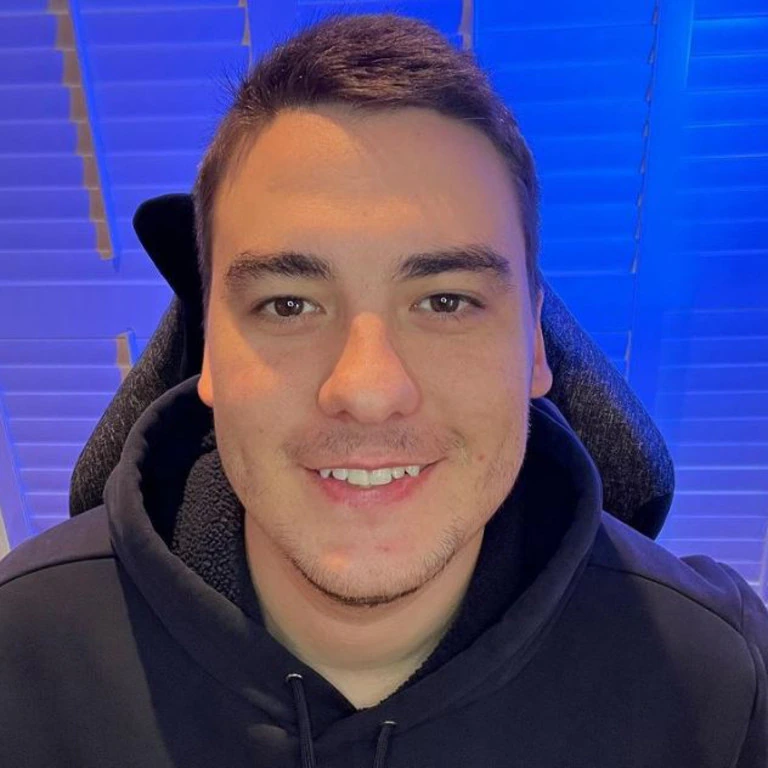
- Boehm in 2022
- Born: 30 March 1994 (age 32); Gold Coast, Queensland, Australia
- Known for: TikTok personality

TikTok information
- Page: jakeyboehm
- Followers: 1.2 million

Jakey Boehm is an Australian TikTok personality, also known as a "Sleepfluencer". He is one of the top 30 streamers on TikTok and the pioneer of interactive streaming on the platform.

Boehm gained notoriety for his innovative use of TikTok's livestream feature, where he broadcasts himself sleeping and allows viewers to disrupt his sleep in return for financial gifts.

== Career ==
Before becoming a TikTok personality in 2022, Boehm was a self-employed web developer. He decided to quit his job to focus on his TikTok career, where he has established a niche for himself by Livestreaming his sleep from 11pm to 6am every night, for a total of seven hours.

His livestreams are interactive, allowing viewers to manipulate his sleeping environment by purchasing various "gifts". These gifts, when bought, trigger different effects in Boehm's room, such as turning on the lights, playing sounds, or activating a bubble machine or an inflatable. The prices of these gifts range from as low as 50 cents to as high as $600, with different effects being triggered depending on the specific gift purchased.

Boehm was the first on the platform to develop a script that scans live chats for specific trigger words and gifts. When a user comments the correct word, or the correct gift is received, it triggers a humorous noise designed to wake him up.

Boehm's innovative use of the livestream feature has attracted a large audience, with up to 8000 people watching at one time. His viewers purchase gifts to activate effects approximately every 10 to 20 seconds, ensuring Boehm is constantly woken or disturbed throughout his livestream.

Despite TikTok taking a 50% commission from each gift, Boehm reportedly earns around $50,000 a month from his livestream.
